Pierre Sauvestre (15 April 1915 – 29 November 1980) was a French rower. He competed in the men's eight event at the 1948 Summer Olympics.

References

External links
 

1915 births
1980 deaths
French male rowers
Olympic rowers of France
Rowers at the 1948 Summer Olympics
Place of birth missing